Edwin Powell Hubble (November 20, 1889 – September 28, 1953) was an American astronomer. He played a crucial role in establishing the fields of extragalactic astronomy and observational cosmology.

Hubble proved that many objects previously thought to be clouds of dust and gas and classified as "nebulae" were actually galaxies beyond the Milky Way. He used the strong direct relationship between a classical Cepheid variable's luminosity and pulsation period (discovered in 1908 by Henrietta Swan Leavitt) for scaling galactic and extragalactic distances.

Hubble provided evidence that the recessional velocity of a galaxy increases with its distance from the Earth, a property now known as Hubble's law, although it had been proposed two years earlier by Georges Lemaître. The Hubble law implies that the universe is expanding. A decade before, the American astronomer Vesto Slipher had provided the first evidence that the light from many of these nebulae was strongly red-shifted, indicative of high recession velocities.

Hubble's name is most widely recognized for the Hubble Space Telescope, which was named in his honor, with a model prominently displayed in his hometown of Marshfield, Missouri.

Early life and education 
Edwin Hubble was born to Virginia Lee Hubble (née James) (1864–1934) and John Powell Hubble, an insurance executive, in Marshfield, Missouri, and moved to Wheaton, Illinois, in 1900. In his younger days, he was noted more for his athletic prowess than his intellectual abilities, although he did earn good grades in every subject except spelling. Edwin was a gifted athlete, playing baseball, football, and running track in both high school and college. He won seven first places and a third place in a single high school track and field meet in 1906 and he played a variety of positions on the basketball court from center to shooting guard. Hubble led the University of Chicago's basketball team to their first Big Ten Conference title in 1907.

Undergraduate studies
Hubble's studies at the University of Chicago were concentrated on mathematics, astronomy and philosophy, which resulted in a bachelor of science degree by 1910. Hubble also became a member of the Kappa Sigma Fraternity.  A Rhodes Scholar, he spent three years at The Queen's College, Oxford  studying jurisprudence instead of science (as a promise to his dying father), and later added studies in literature and Spanish, eventually earning his master's degree.

In 1909, Hubble's father moved his family from Chicago to Shelbyville, Kentucky, so that the family could live in a small town, ultimately settling in nearby Louisville. His father died in the winter of 1913, while Edwin was still in England. In the following summer, Edwin returned home to care for his mother, two sisters, and younger brother, along with his brother William. The family moved once more to Everett Avenue, in Louisville's Highlands neighborhood, to accommodate Edwin and William.

Hubble was also a dutiful son, who despite his intense interest in astronomy since boyhood, acquiesced to his father's request to study law, first at the University of Chicago and later at Oxford. In this time, he also took some math and science courses. After the death of his father in 1913, Edwin returned to the Midwest from Oxford but did not have the motivation to practice law. Instead, he proceeded to teach Spanish, physics and mathematics at New Albany High School in New Albany, Indiana, where he also coached the boys' basketball team. After a year of high-school teaching, he entered graduate school with the help of his former professor from the University of Chicago to study astronomy at the university's Yerkes Observatory, where he received his Ph.D. in 1917. His dissertation was titled "Photographic Investigations of Faint Nebulae".  In Yerkes, he had access to one of the most powerful telescopes in the world at the time, which had an innovative 24 inch (61 cm) reflector.

Doctoral studies

After the United States declared war on Germany in 1917, Hubble rushed to complete his Ph.D. dissertation so he could join the military. Hubble volunteered for the United States Army and was assigned to the newly created 86th Division, where he served in 2nd Battalion, 343 Infantry Regiment. He rose to the rank of Major, and was found fit for overseas duty on July 9, 1918, but the 86th Division never saw combat. After the end of World War I, Hubble spent a year at Cambridge University, where he renewed his studies of astronomy.

Career
In 1919, Hubble was offered a staff position at the Carnegie Institution for Science's Mount Wilson Observatory, near Pasadena, California, by George Ellery Hale, the founder and director of the observatory. Hubble remained on staff at Mount Wilson until his death in 1953. Shortly before his death, Hubble became the first astronomer to use the newly completed giant  reflector Hale Telescope at the Palomar Observatory near San Diego, California.

Hubble also worked as a civilian for U.S. Army at Aberdeen Proving Ground in Maryland during World War II as the Chief of the External Ballistics Branch of the Ballistics Research Laboratory during which he directed a large volume of research in exterior ballistics which increased the effective firepower of bombs and projectiles. His work was facilitated by his personal development of several items of equipment for the instrumentation used in exterior ballistics, the most outstanding development being the high-speed clock camera, which made possible the study of the characteristics of bombs and low-velocity projectiles in flight. The results of his studies were credited with greatly improving design, performance, and military effectiveness of bombs and rockets. For his work there, he received the Legion of Merit award.

Discoveries

Universe goes beyond the Milky Way galaxy

Edwin Hubble's arrival at Mount Wilson Observatory, California, in 1919 coincided roughly with the completion of the  Hooker Telescope, then the world's largest. At that time, the prevailing view of the cosmos was that the universe consisted entirely of the Milky Way Galaxy. 

Using the Hooker Telescope at Mount Wilson, Hubble identified Cepheid variables, a standard candle discovered by Henrietta Leavitt. Comparing their apparent luminosity to their intrinsic luminosity gives their distance from Earth. Hubble found Cepheids in several nebulae, including the Andromeda Nebula and Triangulum Nebula. His observations, made in 1924, proved conclusively that these nebulae were much too distant to be part of the Milky Way and were, in fact, entire galaxies outside our own, thus today they are no longer considered nebulae. 

This was first hypothesized as early as 1755 when Immanuel Kant's General History of Nature and Theory of the Heavens appeared. This hypothesis was opposed by many in the astronomy establishment of the time, in particular by Harvard University-based Harlow Shapley. Hubble's results for Andromeda were not formally published in a peer-reviewed scientific journal until 1929.

Hubble's findings fundamentally changed the scientific view of the universe. Supporters state that Hubble's discovery of nebulae outside of our galaxy helped pave the way for future astronomers. Although some of his more renowned colleagues simply scoffed at his results, Hubble ended up publishing his findings on nebulae. This published work earned him an award titled the American Association Prize and five hundred dollars from Burton E. Livingston of the Committee on Awards.

Hubble also devised the most commonly used system for classifying galaxies, grouping them according to their appearance in photographic images. He arranged the different groups of galaxies in what became known as the Hubble sequence.

Redshift increases with distance

Hubble went on to estimate the distances to 24 extra-galactic nebulae, using a variety of methods. In 1929 Hubble examined the relationship between these distances and their radial velocities as determined from their redshifts. His estimated distances are now known to all be too small, by up to a factor of about 7. This was due to factors such as the fact that there are two kinds of Cepheid variables or confusing bright gas clouds with bright stars. However, his distances were more or less proportional to the true distances, and combining his distances with measurements of the redshifts of the galaxies by Vesto Slipher, and by his assistant Milton L. Humason, he found a roughly linear relationship between the distances of the galaxies and their radial velocities (corrected for solar motion), a discovery that later became known as Hubble's law.

This meant that the greater the distance between any two galaxies, the greater their relative speed of separation. If interpreted that way, Hubble's measurements on 46 galaxies lead to a value for the Hubble constant of 500 km/s/Mpc, which is much higher than the currently accepted values of 74 km/s/Mpc  (cosmic distance ladder method) or 68 km/s/Mpc  (CMB method) due to errors in their distance calibrations.

Yet the reason for the redshift remained unclear. Georges Lemaître predicted on theoretical grounds based on Einstein's equations for general relativity the redshift-distance relation, and published observational support for it, two years before the discovery of Hubble's law. Although he used the term "velocities" in his paper (and "apparent radial velocities" in the introduction), he later expressed doubt about interpreting these as real velocities. In 1931 he wrote a letter to the Dutch cosmologist Willem de Sitter expressing his opinion on the theoretical interpretation of the redshift-distance relation:

Today, the "apparent velocities" in question are usually thought of as an increase in proper distance that occurs due to the expansion of the universe. Light traveling through an expanding metric will experience a Hubble-type redshift, a mechanism somewhat different from the Doppler effect (although the two mechanisms become equivalent descriptions related by a coordinate transformation for nearby galaxies).

In the 1930s, Hubble was involved in determining the distribution of galaxies and spatial curvature. These data seemed to indicate that the universe was flat and homogeneous, but there was a deviation from flatness at large redshifts. According to Allan Sandage,

There were methodological problems with Hubble's survey technique that showed a deviation from flatness at large redshifts. In particular, the technique did not account for changes in luminosity of galaxies due to galaxy evolution.
Earlier, in 1917, Albert Einstein had found that his newly developed theory of general relativity indicated that the universe must be either expanding or contracting. Unable to believe what his own equations were telling him, Einstein introduced a cosmological constant (a "fudge factor") to the equations to avoid this "problem". When Einstein learned of Hubble's redshifts, he immediately realized that the expansion predicted by general relativity must be real, and in later life, he said that changing his equations was "the biggest blunder of [his] life." In fact, Einstein apparently once visited Hubble and tried to convince him that the universe was expanding.

Hubble also discovered the asteroid 1373 Cincinnati on August 30, 1935. In 1936 he wrote The Observational Approach to Cosmology and The Realm of the Nebulae which explained his approaches to extra-galactic astronomy and his view of the subject's history.

In December 1941, Hubble reported to the American Association for the Advancement of Science that results from a six-year survey with the Mt. Wilson telescope did not support the expanding universe theory. According to a Los Angeles Times article reporting on Hubble's remarks, "The nebulae could not be uniformly distributed, as the telescope shows they are, and still fit the explosion idea. Explanations which try to get around what the great telescope sees, he said, fail to stand up. The explosion, for example, would have had to start long after the earth was created, and possibly even after the first life appeared here." (Hubble's estimate of what we now call the Hubble constant would put the Big Bang only 2 billion years ago.)

Personal life
Hubble married Grace Lillian (Burke) Leib (1889–1980), daughter of John Patrick and Luella (Kepford) Burke, on February 26, 1924.

Hubble was raised as a Protestant Christian but some of his later statements suggest uncertainty.

Health issues and death
Hubble had a heart attack in July 1949 while on vacation in Colorado. He was cared for by his wife and continued on a modified diet and work schedule. He died of cerebral thrombosis (a blood clot in his brain) on September 28, 1953, in San Marino, California. No funeral was held for him, and his wife never revealed his burial site.

Controversies

Accusations concerning Lemaître's priority
In 2011, the journal Nature reported claims that Hubble had played a role in the redaction of key parts of the translation of Lemaître's 1927 paper, which stated what is now called Hubble's Law and also gave observational evidence for it.  Historians quoted in the article were skeptical that the redactions were part of a campaign to ensure Hubble retained priority. However, the observational astronomer Sidney van den Bergh published a paper suggesting that while the omissions may have been made by a translator, they may still have been deliberate.

In November 2011, the astronomer Mario Livio reported in Nature that documents in the Lemaître archive demonstrated that the redaction had indeed been carried out by Lemaître himself, who apparently saw little point in including scientific content which had already been reported by Hubble. This, however, does not detract from the fact that Lemaître published in French, without such omissions, two years prior to Hubble.

Attempt at obtaining the Nobel Prize

At the time, the Nobel Prize in Physics did not recognize work done in astronomy. Hubble spent much of the later part of his career attempting to have astronomy considered an area of physics, instead of being its own science. He did this largely so that astronomers—including himself—could be recognized by the Nobel Prize Committee for their valuable contributions to astrophysics. This campaign was unsuccessful in Hubble's lifetime, but shortly after his death, the Nobel Prize Committee decided that astronomical work would be eligible for the physics prize. However, the prize is not one that can be awarded posthumously.

Honors

Awards 

Newcomb Cleveland Prize in 1924;
Bruce Medal in 1938;
Franklin Medal in 1939;
Gold Medal of the Royal Astronomical Society in 1940;
Legion of Merit for outstanding contribution to ballistics research in 1946;

Namesakes 

 Asteroid 2069 Hubble;
 The crater Hubble on the Moon;
 Orbiting Hubble Space Telescope;
 Edwin P. Hubble Planetarium, located in the Edward R. Murrow High School, Brooklyn, NY.;
 Edwin Hubble Highway, the stretch of Interstate 44 passing through his birthplace of Marshfield, Missouri;
 Hubble Middle School, a public school in Wheaton, Illinois, where he lived from 11 years old and up.

Stamp
On March 6, 2008, the United States Postal Service released a 41-cent stamp honoring Hubble on a sheet titled "American Scientists" designed by artist Victor Stabin. His citation reads:

(Note that the assertion that he would have won the Nobel Prize in 1953 is likely false, although he was nominated for the prize that year.)

The other scientists on the "American Scientists" sheet include Gerty Cori, biochemist; Linus Pauling, chemist, and John Bardeen, physicist.

Other notable appearances 
 1934 Delivered the Halley Lecture] at Oxford University
 Hall of Famous Missourians 2003
 2008 "American Scientists" US stamp series, $0.41.
 2017 Indiana Basketball Hall of Fame

In popular culture
In the 1980 documentary Cosmos: A Personal Voyage by astronomer Carl Sagan, Hubble's life and work are portrayed on screen in episode 10: "The Edge of Forever".

The play Creation's Birthday, written by Cornell physicist Hasan Padamsee, tells Hubble's life story.

See also

References

Further reading
 Bartusiak, Marcia. The Day We Found the Universe. New York: Pantheon, 2009.
 Christianson, Gale; Edwin Hubble: Mariner of the Nebulae Farrar Straus & Giroux (T) (New York, August 1995.)
 Hubble E.P., The Observational Approach to Cosmology (Oxford, 1937.)
  Alt URL
 
 Mayall, N.U., Edwin Powell Hubble Biographical Memoirs NAS 41
 
 Harry Nussbaumer and Lydia Bieri, Discovering the expanding universe. Cambridge University Press, 2009.

External links

 Time profile
 Astronomy at the University of Louisville — Photographs of Edwin Hubble at New Albany High School.
 Edwin Hubble bio — Written by Allan Sandage
 
 American Physical Society's Hubble Bio
 Edwin Powell Hubble — The man who discovered the cosmos 
 The problem of the expanding universe, 1942 Edwin Hubble

 
1889 births
1953 deaths
20th-century American astronomers
American agnostics
American astrophysicists
American men's basketball players
American Rhodes Scholars
American cosmologists
Discoverers of asteroids
Alumni of The Queen's College, Oxford
Chicago Maroons baseball players
Chicago Maroons men's basketball players
Recipients of the Gold Medal of the Royal Astronomical Society
Recipients of the Legion of Merit
United States Army personnel of World War I
United States Army personnel of World War II
Military personnel from Missouri
United States Army officers
People from Marshfield, Missouri
People from San Marino, California
People from Wheaton, Illinois
Physicists from Missouri
Members of the United States National Academy of Sciences
High school basketball coaches in Indiana
The Astrophysical Journal editors
Hubble Space Telescope